The list of ship launches in 1771 includes a chronological list of some ships launched in 1771.


References

1771
Ship launches